Air Marshal Sir Gilbert Edward Nicholetts,  (9 November 1902 – 7 September 1983) was a senior commander in the Royal Air Force during the 1950s.

RAF career
Educated at Royal Naval College, Dartmouth, Nicholetts joined the Royal Air Force (RAF) in 1921. He developed a career in flying boat units and with the Fleet Air Arm, then under RAF control. In the late 1920s he was based in the Far East, flying the Short Singapore.

In 1933 Nicholetts established a long-distance flight record from Cranwell, England to Walvis Bay, South West Africa as navigator on the Fairey Long-range Monoplane, continuing on to Cape Town. He was awarded the Air Force Cross.

Nicholetts was appointed Officer Commanding No. 228 Squadron, just after the outbreak of the Second World War. Based at Alexandria, Egypt, flying a Short Sunderland, Nicholetts personally commanded the RAF reconnaissance flight preceding the November 1940 Fleet Air Arm Taranto raid. He went on to be Station Commander at RAF Haifa and then RAF Shallufa, before later being taken prisoner of war by the Japanese in 1942 in the Dutch East Indies. After the war he became Senior Air Service Officer at Headquarters No. 25 (Armament) Group and then Air Officer Commanding the Central Photographic Establishment before becoming Director of Organisation at the Air Ministry in 1948. He was then made Senior Air Service Officer at Headquarters RAF Coastal Command in 1951, Air Officer Commanding No. 21 Group in 1953 and Air Officer Commanding AHQ Malta in 1956. His last appointment was as Inspector-General of the RAF in 1958 before retiring in 1959.

References

1902 births
1983 deaths
Companions of the Order of the Bath
Knights Commander of the Order of the British Empire
Recipients of the Air Force Cross (United Kingdom)
Royal Air Force air marshals
Royal Air Force personnel of World War II